Argentina sent a delegation to compete at the 2010 Winter Paralympics, in Vancouver. It fielded a total of two athletes, both in alpine skiing.

Although Argentina has been competing at the Summer Paralympics since their inception in 1960, this was the country's first ever participation in the Winter Paralympic Games.

Alpine skiing 

The following two athletes represented Argentina in alpine skiing:

See also
Argentina at the 2010 Winter Olympics
Argentina at the Paralympics

References

External links
Vancouver 2010 Paralympic Games official website
International Paralympic Committee official website

Nations at the 2010 Winter Paralympics
2010
Paralympics